The salamander shark or salamander catshark (Parmaturus pilosus) is a little known catshark that inhabits a range from Japan and the East China Sea, on the upper to middle continental slope at depths of 358–895 m.

Overview
Specimens of this species can attain a total length of at least 64 cm. This catshark is a potential bycatch of trawl fisheries operating within its range, but no details are available. There are high levels of squalene in this catshark's liver. The reproduction of this catshark is oviparous.

References

External links

Shark Skeleton

Parmaturus
Fish described in 1906